Desert glass may refer to:

 Libyan desert glass, in Egypt and Libya
 Atacama desert glass, in Chile
 Edeowie glass, in South Australia
 Darwin glass, in West Coast, Tasmania
 Fulgurite, lumps of glass formed by lightning
 Trinitite, a more specialised subclass is that formed during a nuclear explosion

da:Ørkenglas